Lukas Stagge (born 11 May 1997) is a German footballer who plays as a forward for Chemnitzer FC.

Career
Stagge made his professional debut for Hallescher FC in the 3. Liga on 24 January 2016, coming on as a substitute in the 82nd minute for Ivica Banović in the 1–2 home loss against 1. FC Magdeburg.

References

External links
 Profile at DFB.de
 Profile at kicker.de

1997 births
Living people
People from Quedlinburg
Footballers from Saxony-Anhalt
German footballers
Association football forwards
Hallescher FC players
FSV Union Fürstenwalde players
Chemnitzer FC players
3. Liga players
Regionalliga players